= Linganapalle =

- village
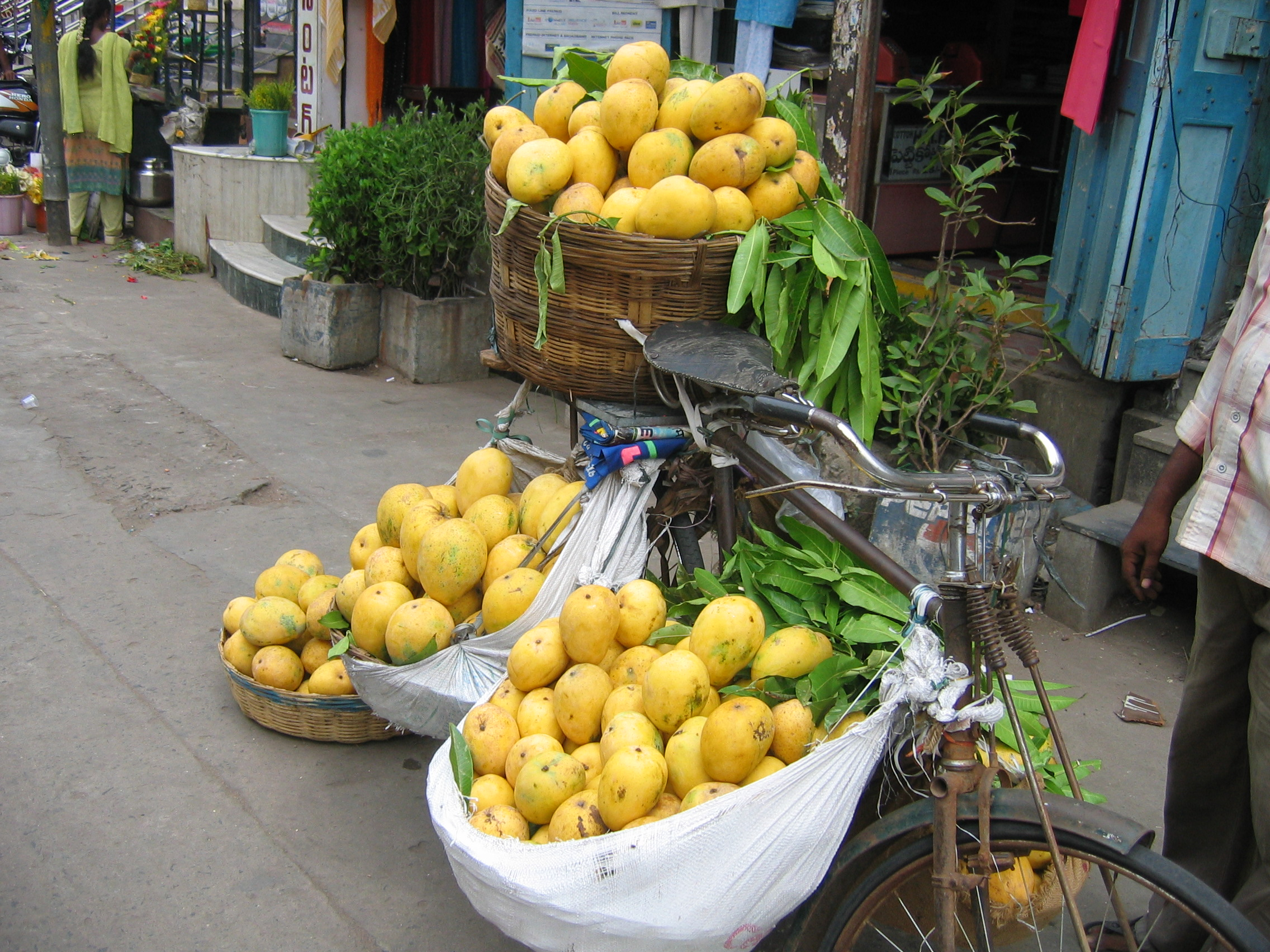
- Linganapalle variety mangoes
- Interactive map of Linganapalle
- Location in Andhra Pradesh, India Linganapalle (India)
- Coordinates: 13.400140°N 79.170887°E
- Country: India
- State: Andhra Pradesh
- District: Chittoor
- Elevation: 209 m (686 ft)

Languages
  - Official: Telugu
- Time zone: UTC+5:30 (IST)
- Postal code: 517126
- Vehicle registration: AP 39

Linganapalle is a village in the state of Andhra Pradesh, India. It lies in Chittoor district, 28 km north of the town of Chittoor. Linganapalle is famous for its mangoes, sugarcane and poultry.
